Virginia Convention in Revolutionary historiography refers to one of the five sessions of the Patriot legislature of Virginia:
First Virginia Convention, held in Williamsburg, Virginia in 1774
Second Virginia Convention, held in Richmond, Virginia in 1775
Third Virginia Convention, held in Richmond, Virginia in 1775
Fourth Virginia Convention, held in Williamsburg, Virginia in 1775
Fifth Virginia Convention, held in Williamsburg, Virgini] in 1776

It may also refer to any of the following Conventions in other historical eras:
Virginia Ratifying Convention, convention to reject or ratify the United States Constitution
Virginia Constitutional Convention of 1829–1830, constitutional convention
Virginia Constitutional Convention of 1850, constitutional convention
Virginia Secession Convention of 1861, convention to decide whether to secede from the United States
Wheeling Convention, convention to reject the Virginia |ordinance of secession and establish the Unionist Restored Government of Virginia
Virginia Loyalist Convention of 1864, constitutional convention for the Restored Government of Virginia
Virginia Constitutional Convention of 1868, constitutional convention
Virginia Constitutional Convention of 1902, constitutional convention